Iga Świątek defeated Naomi Osaka in the final, 6–4, 6–0 to win the women's singles title at the 2022 Miami Open. She became the fourth woman in history, after Steffi Graf, Kim Clijsters, and Victoria Azarenka, to complete the Sunshine Double in singles, having won Indian Wells two weeks earlier. It was Świątek's first Miami Open title, her third consecutive WTA 1000 title, and her fourth WTA 1000-level title overall. Świątek became the first woman in history to win the first three WTA 1000 titles of the year in succession, the first player since Serena Williams in 2013 to win three consecutive WTA 1000 titles, and extended her win streak to 17 matches. She lost no sets and just 26 games en route to the title, the fewest since Martina Hingis dropped 21 games in 2000.

Ranked as the world No. 77, Osaka was the lowest-ranked Miami Open finalist in history, surpassing Clijsters' 2005 achievement as the then-world No. 38.

Ashleigh Barty was the two-time reigning champion, but withdrew from the tournament citing health issues. She later announced her retirement from professional tennis.

Świątek and Paula Badosa were in contention for the WTA No. 1 singles ranking at the start of the tournament after Barty requested to be removed from the WTA rankings following her retirement. Świątek became the new world No. 1 after winning her second round match, making her the 28th player and the first Pole to hold the top singles position since the computer rankings began in 1975. Świątek is also be the first player born in the 21st century (male or female) to hold a world No. 1 singles ranking.

Like at Indian Wells, the international governing bodies of tennis (WTA, ATP, ITF, Australian Open, French Open, Wimbledon, US Open) allowed players from Russia and Belarus to continue to participate in tennis events on tour and at the majors, but not under the name or flag of Russia or Belarus until further notice, due to the 2022 Russian invasion of Ukraine.

Seeds
All seeds received a bye into the second round.

Draw

Finals

Top half

Section 1

Section 2

Section 3

Section 4

Bottom half

Section 5

Section 6

Section 7

Section 8

Seeded players
The following are the seeded players. Seedings are based on WTA rankings as of March 7, 2022. Rankings and points before are as of March 21, 2022.

Because points from the 2021 tournament were not mandatory, they are included in the table below only if they counted towards the player's ranking as of March 21, 2022. Players who are not defending points from the 2021 tournament will instead have their 16th best result replaced by their points from the 2022 tournament.

† The player is defending points from a 2019 ITF Women's World Tennis Tour tournament.

Withdrawn players
The following players would have been seeded, but withdrew before the tournament began.

† The player retired from professional tennis and requested to be removed from the WTA rankings at the end of the tournament.
‡ The player is defending points from a 2019 ITF Women's World Tennis Tour tournament.

Other entry information

Wildcards

Source:

Protected ranking

Qualifiers

Lucky losers

Withdrawals

Qualifying

Seeds

Qualifiers

Lucky losers

Qualifying draw

First qualifier

Second qualifier

Third qualifier

Fourth qualifier

Fifth qualifier

Sixth qualifier

Seventh qualifier

Eighth qualifier

Ninth qualifier

Tenth qualifier

Eleventh qualifier

Twelfth qualifier

References

External links
 Main draw
 Qualifying draw

Miami Open - Women's singles
Singles women